Mazirbe ( or) is a village place in Kolka Parish, Talsi Municipality, Latvia 18 km southwest of Kolka. It is one of twelve Livonian villages on  - the Livonian Coast. Mazirbe is the cultural capital of the Livonians.

The modern Livonian flag (introduced in the 1920s) is green for the forests, white for the sandy beaches of the coast, and blue for the sea. Since the cultural awakening known as the Atmoda, it has flown over the Livonian House of the People ( or), a cultural centre dating from 1938 built in the heart of the village with the support of linguistic cousins in Hungary, Finland and Estonia. Inside is a small museum showing photos of past generations of Livonians. On the first Sunday of August there is a Livonian gathering here, culminating in a procession to the beach where a wreath is cast into the sea in remembrance of fishermen who have met watery deaths. A camp for young people where only Livonian is spoken is held for a week beforehand. The Mazirbe plague stone is a unique feature of the village.

See also 
 Livonian people

References

External links 

Towns and villages in Latvia
Talsi Municipality
Courland